Fatepur Union is a union of Mirzapur Upazila, Tangail District, Bangladesh. It is situated  10 km north of Mirzapur and 22 km southeast of Tangail, The district headquarter.

Demographics
According to Population Census 2011 performed by Bangladesh Bureau of Statistics, The total population of Fatehpur union is 20813. There are 4880 households in total.

Education
The literacy rate of Fatepur Union is 50.2% (Male-53.5%, Female-47.4%).

See also
 Union Councils of Tangail District

References

Populated places in Dhaka Division
Populated places in Tangail District
Unions of Mirzapur Upazila